Cléber Nascimento da Silva (born 13 June 1986), known as just Cléber, is a Brazilian footballer who plays as a winger for OFK Malženice.

Club career
Cléber's European career began in Armenian club Mika. He played in UEFA Cup against Petržalka in the second round of 2007-2008 season. After these matches, Petržalka got interested in signing Cléber. In January 2012, he was transferred to Petržalka. The next club in his career was Czech club Slovácko. After this spell, Cléber left back to his native Brazil, where he spent two years.

In January 2012, he came to Nitra and signed two and half year contract.

He was signed by Spartak Trnava in August 2014. He made his league debut for them against ŽP Šport Podbrezová on 10 August 2014.

Personal life
Cléber resides in Nitra, Slovakia.

References

External links

Futbalnet profile
Fotbal.idnes.cz profile

1986 births
Living people
Footballers from São Paulo
Brazilian footballers
Brazilian expatriate footballers
Association football midfielders
FC Mika players
FC Petržalka players
1. FC Slovácko players
FC Nitra players
FC Spartak Trnava players
ŠK Slovan Bratislava players
FC ViOn Zlaté Moravce players
ŠKF Sereď players
KFC Kalná nad Hronom players
OFK Malženice players
Armenian Premier League players
Slovak Super Liga players
Czech First League players
3. Liga (Slovakia) players
Expatriate footballers in Armenia
Brazilian expatriate sportspeople in Armenia
Expatriate footballers in Slovakia
Brazilian expatriate sportspeople in Slovakia
Expatriate footballers in the Czech Republic
Brazilian expatriate sportspeople in the Czech Republic